Smygehuk is a harbour and fishing village at Smygehamn in Skåne, Sweden. It is most known for being the southernmost point of Sweden, and the entire Scandinavian Peninsula (55° 20' N). To the west of the harbour are Smygehuk Lighthouse and Smygehuk Hostel.

A statue of a nude woman stands in the harbour. It was made by artist Axel Ebbe and installed in 1930. It is named Famntaget ("The Embrace"). The model for the statue was Birgit Holmquist, mother of the model Nena von Schlebrügge and grandmother of actress Uma Thurman.

References

Extreme points of Sweden
Ports and harbours of Sweden
Fishing communities
Populated coastal places in Sweden
Populated places in Skåne County